Loch Gabhair (Lagore), meaning "Lake of the Goats", is an area in the barony of Ratoath, County Meath, Ireland. It is located between the villages of Ratoath and Dunshaughlin and is the namesake of the townlands of Lagore Big (Loch Gabhar Mór) and Lagore Little (Loch Gabhar Beag).

Lagore is also home to the Lagore crannóg, the Irish royal residence of the 7th to 10th centuries.

During excavations of the site a number of bronze items were found, including weapons and brooches. These finds included the Lagore Brooch, which can now be found at the National Museum of Ireland on Kildare Street in Dublin.

Kings of Lagore/Deiscert Breg (south Brega)
List incomplete: see Mac Shamhráin, 2004.

 Fergus mac Fogartach mac Niall mac Cernach Sotal (a quo Clan Chernach Sotal) mac Diarmait mac Áed Sláine, died 751
 Máel Dáin mac Fergus, died 785
 Ailill mac Fergus, (rí Deiscert Breg), died 800
 Beollan mac Ciarmac (descendant of Máel Dáin ?), died 979
 Gilla Mo Chonna mac Fogartach mac Ciarmac (rí Deiscert Breg), died 1013

References

 Lagore Crannog:an Irish royal residence of the seventh to tenth centuries AD, J. Hencken, RIA Proc. 53 C, 1950, pp. 1–247
 Historical note on Cnogba (Knowth), Francis John Byrne, RIA Proc. 66C, pp. 383–400, 1968.
 
 Lagore, Co. meath and Ballinderry No. 1, County Westmeath Crannogs:some possible structural reinterpretations, C.J. Lynn, Journal of Irish Archaeology 3, 1985–86, pp. 69–73
 Topographical note:Moynagh Lough, Nobber, Co. Meath, Edel Bhreathnach, Riocht na Midhe 9:4, 1988, pp. 16–19.
 George Eogan, Life and living at Lagore, in Seanchas: Studies in Early and Medieval Irish Archaeology, History and Literature in Honour of Francis John Byrne, pp. 64–82, ed. Alfred P. Smyth, Four Courts Press, Dublin, 2000
 Ailbhe Mac Shamhráin, Church and dynasty in Early Christian Brega: Lusk, Inis Pátraic and the cast of Máel-Finnia, king and saint, Table 8.1, Lineages of Síl nÁedo Sláine, p. 127; in The Island of St Patrick: Church and ruling dynasties in Fingal and Meath, 400-1148, (ed.) Mac Shamhráin, Four Courts, 2004.

 

Townlands of County Meath
Archaeological sites in County Meath
Kings of Brega